Roma, l'altra faccia della violenza is a 1976 "poliziottesco" film directed by Marino Girolami and starring Marcel Bozzuffi.

Plot

Cast
Marcel Bozzuffi as Commissioner Carli
Anthony Steffen as Dr. Alessi
Enio Girolami as Commissioner Ferreri
Roberta Paladini as Carol Alessi
Jean Favre as Giulio Laurenti
Stefano Patrizi as Giorgio Alessi
Franco Citti as Berté
Sergio Fiorentini as Nardi
Umberto Liberati as Stefano
Valerio Merola as Andrea
Enzo Andronico as Tarantini, the lawyer
Massimo Vanni as Vanni

Release
Roma, l'altra faccia della violenza was distributed in Italy by 20th Century Fox on 27 July 1976. It was distributed in Paris on 6 July 1977 as L'autre cote de la violence.

See also
 List of Italian films of 1976

References

References

External links

1976 crime films
1976 films
Films directed by Marino Girolami
Italian crime films
French crime films
Poliziotteschi films
Films scored by Fabio Frizzi
1970s Italian films
1970s French films